Montiano is a village in Tuscany, central Italy, administratively a frazione of the comune of Magliano in Toscana, province of Grosseto, in the area of Maremma. At the time of the 2001 census its population amounted to 465.

Montiano is about 18 km from Grosseto and 9 km from Magliano in Toscana, and it is situated along the Provincial Road which links the two towns.

Main sights 
 San Giovanni Battista (13th century), main parish church of the village.
 San Giuseppe (16th century), it was restructured in the 19th century.
 Clock tower (12th century), former seat of Aldobrandeschi family and then town hall, it's now a private house.
 Castle of Montiano Vecchio, ruins of an ancient castle of the 12th century.
 Walls of Montiano, old fortifications which surround the village since the 13th century.

References

Bibliography 
 Aldo Mazzolai, Guida della Maremma. Percorsi tra arte e natura, Le Lettere, Florence, 1997.

See also 
 Magliano in Toscana
 Pereta

Frazioni of Magliano in Toscana